Giorgio Bianchi may refer to:
Giorgio Bianchi (director) (1904–1967), Italian film director and actor
Giorgio Bianchi (1575–1646), Roman Catholic bishop known as Gjergj Bardhi in Albanian